Cedar Point Light may refer to:

Cedar Point Light (Maryland), at the mouth of the Patuxent River, Chesapeake Bay, Maryland
Lower Cedar Point Light, in the Potomac River, Maryland
Upper Cedar Point Light, in the Potomac River, Maryland
Cedar Point Light (Ohio), listed on the NRHP in Ohio